A number of Actinopterygiian fish have been given the common name whiting.

Gadiformes (cod-like)
 The fish originally known by the name "whiting" in English is Merlangius merlangus, in the family Gadidae. This species inhabits the eastern Atlantic Ocean and the Mediterranean Sea, as well as the North Sea on the East Coast of Britain. In the United States, it is commonly known as the English whiting.
 In Canada, it is used for the Alaska pollock, Theragra chalcogramma.
 In the Southern Ocean, it is used for the southern blue whiting.
 In the US, the name whiting on its own is often used for various species of hake in the genus Merluccius.

Sciaenidae
 Species Menticirrhus americanus (also known as the Carolina whiting, king whiting, sea mullet, southern kingcroaker, and southern kingfish) found along the Atlantic and Gulf Coasts of the United States.

Smelt-whitings
 In Australia, India, and throughout the Indo-Pacific, the name whiting is used for fish in the family Sillaginidae. (Well-known members include Japanese whiting, King George whiting, northern whiting, sand whiting, and school whiting.)

References

Fish common names
Gadidae

da:Hvilling
de:Wittling
is:Lýsa
nl:Wijting
no:Hvitting
pl:Witlinek
sv:Vitling
tr:Mezgit